Isekai no Seikishi Monogatari is an OVA anime series created by Masaki Kajishima, the creator of the Tenchi Muyo! series. The story follows a young boy named Kenshi Masaki, the half-sibling of Tenchi Masaki, who is transported to the world of Geminar for unknown reasons. In Geminar, there are humanoid mecha called Sacred Mechanoids, which are used to fight wars, and Sacred Mechamasters, the people who pilot them.

Isekai no Seikishi Monogatari is produced by AIC and BeSTACK under the directorship of Koji Yoshikawa, with series composition by Hideki Shirane, characters by Hajime Watanabe, music by Akifumi Tada, and produced by Shoji Ohta, Yasuo Ueda, and Yoshiyuki Matsuzaki, respectively. Thirteen episodes aired in Japan between March 20, 2009 and March 19, 2010 on their Pay-Per-View television channel Animax. The episodes were later released on DVD and Blu-ray by VAP from May 22, 2009 to May 26, 2010. A Blu-ray box set was later released on May 18, 2011. In 2012, the anime was licensed by Funimation Entertainment in North America under the title Tenchi Muyo! War on Geminar.

The opening theme for the series is "Follow Me" by Japanese-Canadian pop singer Seira Kagami featuring Sound Around, while the ending theme is "Destino" by Alchemy+. The opening theme was later released as a maxi single by VAP on January 14, 2010.


Episodes

References

External links
 Official website 

Tenchi Muyo! War on Geminar
War on Geminar